The George F. Allison House is a historic house located at 418 West Duval Street in Live Oak, Florida, United States. It is locally significant as the home of George F. Allison, who was a pioneering Live Oak businessman during the city's formative commercial years as well as being a fine example of Colonial Revival architecture in the area.

Description and history 
Although the actual construction date and builder of the house are not known, the house is shown on a 1903 Sanborn Insurance map. The large, two-story, Colonial Revival style house was given its present appearance when it was remodeled in 1927 after 40% of the rear was damaged by a fire on New Years Day. Since then, however, very little about the house or the surrounding lot has change. On April 20, 1995, it was added to the U.S. National Register of Historic Places.

Gallery

References

Houses on the National Register of Historic Places in Florida
Houses in Suwannee County, Florida
National Register of Historic Places in Suwannee County, Florida
Colonial Revival architecture in Florida